George Albright may refer to:

 George W. Albright (born 1846), African-American politician from Mississippi
 George Albright (Florida politician) (born 1956), politician from Florida